Rugulina ignobilis is a species of sea snail, a marine gastropod mollusk in the family Pendromidae.

References

External links
 To World Register of Marine Species

Pendromidae
Gastropods described in 1912